Buchli is an unincorporated community in Napa County, California. It lies at an elevation of 16 feet (5 m) between Los Carneros AVA and the Napa-Sonoma Marsh. In the late 19th and early 20th centuries, a railway station in the community was used to ship produce grown in Napa and Sonoma counties along the Southern Pacific Railroad to San Francisco. In 1946, Press Wireless, Inc. constructed a radio station in Buchli which received and processed most news reports from East Asia. The station was the first in the Western United States to receive signals from Sputnik 1. Leslie Salt purchased land to the south in the 1950s, which it developed into salt evaporation ponds. Starting in the 1970s, the California Department of Fish and Wildlife purchased much of the land around Buchli to set aside as a wildlife area.

References 

Unincorporated communities in California
Unincorporated communities in Napa County, California